Victory Christian School was a private Christian school located in the Williamstown section of Monroe Township, in Gloucester County, New Jersey, United States. The school is coeducational and Baptist-affiliated, serving students in kindergarten through twelfth grade. The school colors are royal blue and gold, and its athletic teams are known as the "Warriors". The school is a member of the American Association of Christian Schools (AACS).

As of the 2009–10 school year, the school had 119 students (in K-12, plus 6 in Pre-Kindergarten) and 19.5 faculty members (on an FTE basis), for a student–teacher ratio of 6.1:1.

References

External links
School website
Private School review: Victory Christian School
http://aacs.org/new-searchpage/?state=NJ

Monroe Township, Gloucester County, New Jersey
Baptist schools in the United States
Christian schools in New Jersey
Private elementary schools in New Jersey
Private high schools in Gloucester County, New Jersey
Private middle schools in New Jersey

1968 establishments in New Jersey
Educational institutions established in 1968
Educational institutions disestablished in 2012